Catch the Spirit is a compilation album released by rock band Mostly Autumn in 2002. This replaced the previous anthology Heroes Never Die and provides an introduction to the band using re-recorded material from their first four studio albums.

Track listing

Disc one
"Nowhere to Hide" (Close my Eyes) (Findlay/Josh) – 5:03
"We Come and We Go" (Josh) – 4:41
"Please" (Findlay/Josh/Jennings) – 5:06
"The Spirit of Autumn Past - Part 2" (Findlay/Josh/Jennings) – 4:34
"Evergreen" (Findlay/Josh) – 7:57
"The Riders of Rohan" (Josh/Jennings) – 3:33
"This Great Blue Pearl" (Josh) – 3:58
"Noise From My Head" (Findlay/Josh/Jennings) – 3:05
"Half the Mountain" (Josh) – 5:17
"Shrinking Violet" (Findlay/Josh) – 8:47
"Goodbye Alone" (Josh) – 6:53
"Heroes Never Die" (Josh/Rayson) – 11:14

Disc two
"Overture - The Forge of Sauron" (Josh/Jennings) – 3:52
"The Dark Before the Dawn" (Josh/Jennings/Faulds) – 4:28
"Prints in the Stone" (Josh/Davison) – 3:50
"The Return of the King" (Josh) – 4:26
"The Night Sky" (Josh) – 9:34
"Winter Mountain" (B Josh/R Josh) – 6:22
"The Last Climb" (Josh) – 9:12
"Never the Rainbow" (Findlay/Jennings) – 4:33
"Porcupine Rain" (Findlay/Josh/Jennings) – 5:00
"The Gap Is Too Wide" (Jennings) – 10:37
"Mother Nature" (Josh) – 13:17

Personnel
Bryan Josh - Lead/Backing Vocals; Lead/Rhythm/Acoustic/12 String Guitars; Tambourine
Heather Findlay - Lead/Backing Vocals; Tambourine
Iain Jennings - Keyboards; Hammond Organ; Piano; Backing Vocals
Angela Gordon - Flute; Recorders; Backing Vocals
Liam Davison - Rhythm/Acoustic/12 String Guitars; Slide Guitars; Backing Vocals
Andy Smith - Bass Guitars
Jonathon Blackmore - Drums

Additional personnel
Duncan Rayson - Keyboards; Piano; Programming
Marcus Bousefield - Violin
Geoffrey Richardson - Violin
Troy Donockley - Uilleann pipes; Flute; High/Low Whistles
Marc Atkinson - Backing Vocals
Gina Dootson - Backing Vocals
Janine Atkinson - Backing Vocals
Marissa Claughn - Backing Vocals
Nicola Garton - Backing Vocals
Mathew Foster - Backing Vocals

References

2002 compilation albums
Mostly Autumn albums